Tomáš Klouček (born March 7, 1980 in Prague, Czechoslovakia) is a Czech former professional ice hockey defenceman. He played in the National Hockey League for the New York Rangers, Nashville Predators and the Atlanta Thrashers between 2000 and 2006. He was drafted 131st overall by the Rangers in the 1998 NHL Entry Draft.

Klouček joined Orli Znojmo in the Erste Bank Eishockey Liga after previously playing in the Slovak Extraliga with HC Kosice. He signed an initial one-month contract with the club on the eve of the 2014–15 season on September 11, 2014.

Career statistics

Regular season and playoffs

References

External links

1980 births
Living people
Atlanta Thrashers players
Barys Nur-Sultan players
Cape Breton Screaming Eagles players
Chicago Wolves players
Czech ice hockey defencemen
Dauphins d'Épinal players
Hartford Wolf Pack players
HC Bílí Tygři Liberec players
HC Košice players
HC Lev Poprad players
HC Oceláři Třinec players
Milwaukee Admirals players
Nashville Predators players
New York Rangers draft picks
New York Rangers players
Orli Znojmo players
PSG Berani Zlín players
Rytíři Kladno players
Ice hockey people from Prague
Syracuse Crunch players
Czech expatriate ice hockey players in Canada
Czech expatriate ice hockey players in the United States
Czech expatriate ice hockey players in Slovakia
Czech expatriate sportspeople in Kazakhstan
Czech expatriate sportspeople in France
Expatriate ice hockey players in France
Expatriate ice hockey players in Kazakhstan